Events from the year 1887 in Denmark.

Incumbents
 Monarch – Christian IX
 Prime minister – J. B. S. Estrup

Events

Sports
 12 July  Odense Boldklub is founded.

Births
 30 May – Emil Reesen, composer and conductor (died 1964)
 10 June – Prince Aage, Count of Rosenborg (died 1940 in Morocco)
 16 June – Gundorph Albertus, silversmith (died 1969)
 3 July – Elith Pio, actor (died 1983)
 9 November – Kaj Gottlob, architect (died 1976)

Deaths
  30 April – J.C. Jacobsen, brewer and industrialist, founder of Carlsberg (born 1811)
  25 August – Thomas Lange, novelist (born 1829)
 13 November – Hans Schjellerup, astronomer (died 1827)

References

 
1880s in Denmark
Denmark
Years of the 19th century in Denmark